Heaven is high and the emperor is far away is a Chinese proverb thought to have originated from Zhejiang during the Yuan dynasty.

The Chinese Central Government in Beijing exercises little direct oversight on the affairs of lower-level governments, allowing much regional autonomy in the country. The proverb has thus come to generally mean that central authorities have little influence over local affairs, and it is often used in reference to corruption.

The saying, as it is considered in China, has multiple meanings. Often it involves something minor such as walking on the grass when no one is watching, ignoring a command because the father is far away, cutting timber when not permitted, or ignoring the one-child policy. It is also used to describe a lawless place far from the authorities.

The original variation, "the mountains are high and the emperor is far away", is also still heard.

Russian similarity

In Russian, there exists a directly similar proverb: до бога высоко, до царя далеко do boga vysoko, do czarya daleko, with a usually omitted rhyming continuation of а до меня близко - кланяйся мне низко a do menya blizko - klanyaysa mne nizko, which can be translated as "God is high, and the czar is far away (while I am near, so bow deeply to me)". In its short form, it is typically used to say there is no hope for external aid; while the full form describes lower echelons of bureaucracy abusing their power while the authority meant to keep them in check is absent or indifferent.

Also, Бог высок и царь очень далёк (Bog vysok i tsar' dalyok, "God is on high and the tsar is very far away").

See also

 Chinese proverbs in Wikiquote

References 

Chinese proverbs
Corruption in China
History of Zhejiang
Yuan dynasty